Joe Watson was an Australian folklorist born in the New South Wales township of Boorowa on 15 August 1881.

External links
Biography
Recordings

1881 births
Australian folklorists
Year of death missing